The  is a Japanese regional bank headquartered in Aomori, Aomori Prefecture, in the Tōhoku region of northern Honshū. 
The Aomori Bank provides financial services for individual and corporate customers, including deposits, loans, securities trading and investment, foreign exchange, and bond underwriting and registration services as well as credit card services.

History
The bank was privatized on September 1, 1897, becoming . It opened numerous branch offices throughout Aomori Prefecture in the 1920s and 1930s, but suffered great losses due to the financial crisis following the 1929 Great Depression. On October 1, 1943, it merged with the Hachinohe Bank, Tsugaru Bank, Itayanagi Bank and the former Aomori Bank to form the new Aomori Bank. The bank was listed on the second section of the Tokyo Stock Exchange from October 1973, and in the first section since 1975. It adopted its present logo mark in 1990.

Aomori Bank cooperated with other banks in the region (including Iwate Bank and Akita Bank) to create a no-fee ATM network; this has declined due to the departure of one of the participant members, Michinoku Bank, in July 2005.

See also
List of banks
List of banks in Japan

References

External links
  Official site
  English part of official site
  Google Finance
  Hoovers Report
  Wiki collection of bibliographic works on Aomori Bank

Companies based in Aomori Prefecture
Regional banks of Japan
Companies listed on the Tokyo Stock Exchange
Banks established in 1879
Japanese companies established in 1879